Jeff McMahan may refer to:

Jeff McMahan (politician), American politician, resigned 2008 for accepting improper cash and gifts
Jeff McMahan (philosopher) (born 1954), American moral philosopher